Bournville may refer to:

 Bournville, a model village in the south of Birmingham
 Bournville (chocolate bar), a brand of dark chocolate produced by Cadbury UK

See also
 Bourneville (disambiguation)